Thick skin can refer to:

 The ability to withstand criticism.
 Literally thick skin covering the body of an animal, such as an elephant or rhinoceros.
 Callus, an area of thickened skin
 Callus (disambiguation), similar uses of Callus such as a lack of empathy (callousness).
 Thick Skinned, a 1989 French film
 "Thick Skin", a song by Leona Lewis from I Am
 Thick Skin, a 2018 album by Tia Gostelow

See also
 Pachyderm (disambiguation)